The practice of deriving sports team names, imagery, and mascots from Indigenous peoples of North America is a significant phenomenon in the United States and Canada. The popularity of the American Indian in global culture has led to a number of teams in Europe also adopting team names derived from Native Americans. In Asia, Africa, Australia and South America, the adoption of Indigenous names generally indicates that the team members are themselves Indigenous. While there are team names in North America derived from other ethnic groups, such as the Boston Celtics, the New York Yankees, the Montreal Canadiens, and the Notre Dame Fighting Irish, these are names selected by groups to represent themselves.

Globally, there are teams in Africa and Europe that use Native American images and logos, while in South America there are a number of teams that reference the Guaraní people. In Brazil, these teams may be referred to using the derogatory term bugre.

The rise of Indigenous rights movements has led to controversy regarding the continuation of practices rooted in colonialism. Such practices maintain the power relationship between the dominant culture and the Indigenous culture, and can be seen as a form of cultural imperialism. Such practices are seen as particularly harmful in schools and universities, which have the stated purpose of promoting ethnic diversity and inclusion. In recognition of the responsibility of higher education to eliminate behaviors that creates a hostile environment for education, in 2005 the NCAA initiated a policy against "hostile and abusive" names and mascots that led to the change of many derived from Native American culture, with the exception of those that established an agreement with particular tribes for the use of their specific names. Other schools retain their names because they were founded for the education of Native Americans, and continue to have a significant number of Indigenous students.

The trend towards the elimination of Indigenous names and mascots in local schools has been steady, with two thirds having been eliminated over the past 50 years according to the National Congress of American Indians (NCAI). In a few states with significant Native American populations, change has been mandated by law, such in Maine, Wisconsin, Oregon, and Washington.

Little League International has updated its 2019 rulebook to include a statement prohibiting "the use of team names, mascots, nicknames or logos that are racially insensitive, derogatory or discriminatory in nature." This decision has been applauded by the National Congress of American Indians.

Professional/Adult teams

Current usage

American football 
 Bristol Aztecs (British American Football League) - Bristol, England
 Bürstadt Redskins, an American Football club in Bürstadt, Germany
 Eberswalder Warriors, an American Football club in Eberswalde, Germany
 Garland Aztecs, Garland, Texas - Semi-Pro
 Mayas CDMX (Liga de Fútbol Americano Profesional) - Mexico City, Mexico
 Mexicas CDMX (Liga de Fútbol Americano Profesional) - Mexico City, Mexico
 Kansas City Chiefs (NFL) - While adopting Native American imagery, the team was named in honor of Kansas City mayor Harold Roe Bartle who was instrumental in bringing the AFL Dallas Texans to Kansas City in 1963 (becoming the last professional team to adopt an Indigenous-derived name). Bartle earned his nickname as founder of the Tribe of Mic-O-Say, a regional Boy Scouts honor camping society in which he was "Chief" Lone Bear. In 1989, the Chiefs switched from Warpaint, a Pinto horse ridden by a man in a feathered headdress, to their current mascot K. C. Wolf. Warpaint returned in 2009, but is ridden by a cheerleader.
 Southern California Apaches - (Semi-Pro, United Football Alliance League)
 Florida State Seminoles (American College Football) NCAA Division I Football Bowl Subdivision (FBS) of the National Collegiate Athletic Association (NCAA) and the Atlantic Division of the Atlantic Coast Conference (ACC) 
 Utah Utes (American College Football) NCAA Division I Football Bowl Subdivision (FBS) of the National Collegiate Athletic Association (NCAA) and the South Division of the Pac-12 Conference (Pac-12)

American 7s Football League 
 New Jersey Savage
 Spanktown Boyz - Uses a Native American wielding a tomahawk as its logo
 Union City Chiefs

Association football 
Belgium
 K.A.A. Gent (Belgian First Division A), Ghent, East Flanders - Known as the Buffaloes, the team uses an Indian head logo and a mascot in faux Native costume.  
Brazil

 Guarani Esporte Clube (CE), Juazeiro do Norte
 Guarani Esporte Clube (MG), Divinópolis
 Guarani Futebol Clube, Campinas
 Guarany Futebol Clube, Bagé
 Guarany Futebol Clube (Camaquã)
 Guarany Sporting Club, Sobral
 Associação Atlética Guarany, Porto da Folha
 Esporte Clube Guarani, Venâncio Aires
 Sociedade Esportiva, Recreativa e Cultural Guarani, Palhoça
 Sport Club Guarany, Cruz Alta
 Tupi Football Club, Juiz de Fora 
 Tupynambás Futebol Clube, Juiz de Fora
Chile
 Colo-Colo, Santiago de Chile. Name relates to the Mapuche
 Lautaro, Buin. Also called Guerreros de Buín (Warriors Buín)
Ecuador
 Sociedad Deportiva Aucas, Quito - Auca (Quechuan for savage) is pejorative name for the Huaorani people
Mexico
 Club Guaraní, Asunción
South Africa
Kaizer Chiefs F.C., Johannesburg

Australian rules football
All of these teams are composed of Indigenous Australians.
 Flying Boomerangs (Australia), in reference to the boomerang, an Indigenous Australian hunting tool and instrument.
 Indigenous All Stars (Australia), formerly known Aboriginal All-Stars

Baseball 
 Gauting Indians, a baseball and softball club from Gauting, a suburb of Munich, Germany. The women's team is the "Squaws".

Major league

 Atlanta Braves (Atlanta, Georgia) - originally Boston Braves, then Milwaukee Braves. The mascot Chief Noc-A-Homa existed until the 1983 season. Princess Win-A-Lotta was introduced in the late 1970s, dropped at same time as Noc-A-Homa. In 1991, the Braves adopted the Tomahawk Chop from Florida State University when Deion Sanders joined the team.
 Caribes de Anzoátegui (Puerto la Cruz, Venezuela) - While Caribe is another name for the Kalina people, it is also a local term for piranhas, particularly in Venezuela. The team has no apparent use of Indigenous imagery.
 
 Indios de Mayagüez - (Indians of Mayaguez) Puerto Rican Baseball team from Mayagüez, Puerto Rico.
 Mayos de Navojoa (Navojoa, Sonora, Mexico) - The Mayo people are indigenous to Sonora
 Yaquis de Obregón (Ciudad Obregón, Sonora, Mexico) - The Yaqui are indigenous to Sonora

Minor league

A Minor league team in Innisfail, Alberta, the "Indians", has made a decision to become the "Trappers". The Danville Braves are changing names for 2021 season in the Appalachian League.

Affiliates of the Atlanta Braves:
 Gulf Coast League Braves (North Port, Florida)
 Mississippi Braves (Pearl, Mississippi)
 Rome Braves (Rome, Georgia)
Affiliate of the Pittsburgh Pirates:
 Indianapolis Indians (Indianapolis, Indiana) - Team announced partnership with Miami Tribe to keep mascot.
Affiliate of the Colorado Rockies:
 Spokane Indians (Spokane, Washington)

Basketball 
All three existing National Basketball Association teams that previously used Indigenous imagery have stopped doing so. (See Prior usage list below).
 Bendigo Braves (Bendigo, Victoria) play in the South East Australian Basketball League
 Guaiqueríes de Margarita, (LPB) - named after an Indigenous people of Northern Venezuela also known as the Waikerí.
 Indios de Ciudad Juárez, Mexico, (Liga Nacional de Baloncesto Profesional)
Indios de Mayagüez, (Puerto Rico Superior Basketball League)
 Quilmes de Mar del Plata, Argentina, (LLA) - named after the Quilmes, an Indigenous people of Northern Argentina.

Ice hockey
 Chelmsford Chieftains (NIHL), Chelmsford, Essex, United Kingdom
 Chicago Blackhawks (NHL)
 Chilliwack Chiefs (BCHL) - While retaining their name, the team retired their mascot "Chief Wannawin". The chief of a local First Nation applauded the move but was disappointed the mascot was part of the team for 20 years.
 Hannover Indians (German Oberliga)
 Macklin Mohawks, Macklin, Saskatchewan
 Malmö Redhawks (Swedish Hockey League)
 Memmingen Indians (German Oberliga)
 Moose Jaw Warriors (WHL)
 Morden Redskins, (SEMHL)
 HC Škoda Plzeň, Czech Republic (Czech Extraliga) uses a Native American logo.
 Seattle Thunderbirds (WHL)
 Shawinigan Cataractes (QMJHL)
 Spokane Chiefs (WHL)
 Whitley Warriors (NIHL), Whitley Bay, United Kingdom.

Indoor soccer
Chihuahua Savage (MASL)

Lacrosse 
 Alberta Lacrosse Association
 Rocky Mountain Lacrosse League
 Junior B Lacrosse
 Edmonton Warriors - Indian head logo
Ontario Lacrosse Association
Major Series Lacrosse:
Six Nations Chiefs, Six Nations of the Grand River
Senior B Lacrosse
Six Nations Rivermen - Logo is an Indian paddling a canoe
Junior A Lacrosse
Burlington Chiefs, Burlington, Ontario
Mississauga Tomahawks
Junior B Lacrosse
Elora Mohawks, Elora, Ontario
Quebec Senior Lacrosse
Kahnawake Mohawks - Cartoon Indian head logo
Kahnawake Tomahawks - Indian head logo
West Coast Senior Lacrosse Association (WSCLA), British Columbia - The Association logo features an "Indian Head"
Coquitlam Adanacs - Although "adanac" is Canada spelled backward, their logo features a First Nations woman.
Langley Warriors
North Shore Indians

Rugby union 
 The Chiefs, formerly the Waikato Chiefs (North Island of New Zealand) - a rugby union side in the Super Rugby competition. Their logo is a male figure holding a Māori club.
 Griquas, South African team named after the Griqua people, however their symbol is an oryx.
 Māori All Blacks, previously the New Zealand Māori, a rugby union side whose members must be at least 1/16 Māori
 Northland Taniwha, a rugby team in the Mitre 10 Cup named after a being from Māori mythology

Rugby league 
 Indigenous All Stars a.k.a. Indigenous All Stars or Indigenous Dreamtime.  Dreamtime is an Indigenous Australian religious/mythological term.
 New Zealand Māori rugby league team
 The New Zealand Warriors, (Auckland, New Zealand), plays in the Australian NRL competition. The team logo indicates the "Warrior" is an Indigenous reference.

Other
 Indianerna (the Indians) are a Swedish motorcycle speedway team based in Kumla, Sweden at (Elitserien)

Prior pro usage

Many professional teams changed because they moved to another city, or went out of business ("Defunct" in table below).

Colleges and universities

Secondary schools

Non-scholastic youth teams

Baseball 
American Indian Little League, Palmdale, California
 Dornbirn Indians, Redskins, and "Little Indians", a youth baseball club in Austria.
Skokie Indians, Skokie, Illinois
Whalley Chiefs, Surrey, British Columbia (British Columbia Premier Baseball League)

Association football
Raynes Park Little League, Kensington, England - Redskins

American football

Pop Warner Little Scholars 
Albemarle Redskins, Albemarle County, Virginia
Antioch Redskins, Plant City, Florida
Bennetts Creek Warriors, Suffolk, Virginia
Derby Red Raiders, Derby, Connecticut
East Bay Warriors, Oakland, California
Fort Braden Chiefs, Fort Braden, Florida
FW Redskins, Goodyear, Arizona
Immokalee Seminoles, Immokalee, Florida
Lower Sussex Indians, Sussex County, Delaware
Nonnewaug Chiefs, Woodbury, Connecticut
Oak Cliff Redskins, Dallas, Texas
Pomperaug Warriors, Southbury, Connecticut
Reynolds Corner Redskins, Toledo, Ohio
Southeast Apaches, San Antonio, Texas
Southland Comanches, Colorado
Stratford Redskin, Stratford, Connecticut
Water Oak Indians, Watertown, Connecticut
Western Albemarle Chiefs, Crozet, Virginia
Willamette Redskins, Eugene, Oregon

Youth/Junior football
Antioch Redskins, Plant City, Florida
CLCF Football, Cranston, Rhode Island (Chiefs)
Catawissa Redskins, Catawissa, Pennsylvania
Donaldsonville Redskins, Donaldsonville, Louisiana
Fauquier Youth Football, Fauquier County, Virginia
Grayling Redskins Youth Football, Grayling, Michigan
Kanawha Youth Football Redskins, Richmond, Virginia
Lancaster Junior Redskins, Lancaster, New York
Loudon Redskins Youth Football, Loudon, Tennessee 
Patterson Redskins Youth Football & Cheer, Patterson, California
Rochester Redskins Youth Football & Cheer, Rochester, Michigan
Sarasota Ringling Redskins, Sarasota, Florida
South Cherokee Football and Cheer "Redskins", Woodstock, Georgia
Southwest Redskins, Houston, Texas
Sterling Heights Redskins, Sterling Heights, Michigan
Vienna Youth Inc. Football Chiefs, Vienna, Virginia
Washington Redskins Midget Football, Washington, New Jersey
Whittier Redskins, Whittier, California
Woonsocket Redskins Youth Football and Cheerleading, Woonsocket, Rhode Island

Ice Hockey 
 Chilliwack Chiefs, Chilliwack, British Columbia (British Columbia Hockey League)
 Copper Cliff Redmen, Copper Cliff, Ontario Team name has changed to the 'Reds' July 2019 CBC article
 Johnstown Tomahawks, Johnstown, Pennsylvania (North American Hockey League)
 Onion Lake Border Chiefs, Onion Lake Cree Nation
 Saddle Lake Warriors, Saddle Lake, Alberta
 Tavistock Braves, Tavistock, Ontario

Lacrosse 
 Akwesasne Indians, Akwesasne, a Mohawk Nation that intersects the United States and Canada
 Elora Mohawks, Elora, Ontario
 Kitchener-Waterloo Braves, Kitchener, Ontario
 Kahnawake Hunters, Kahnawake, Quebec
 Mississauga Tomahawks, Mississauga, Ontario
 Six Nations Arrows, Hagersville, Ontario
 Six Nations Rebels, Hagersville, Ontario
 Six Nations Warriors, Hagersville, Ontario
 Tomahawks, Palo Alto, California
 Whitby Warriors, Whitby, Ontario

Wrestling
 Little Redskins, Illinois Kids Wrestling Federation (IKWF) sanctioned club (K-8th grade) in Morris, Illinois –  Uses a version of the DC team logo

See also
 List of company and product names derived from indigenous peoples
 List of contemporary ethnic groups
 List of indigenous peoples

External links

Sources of data on teams/mascots
MaxPreps is a site for U.S. High School sports information, and can be searched by mascot name as well as school name, but the data is not kept up to date so it is only a starting place.
MascotDB is a searchable database of mascots from Pro to High School.
List of Semi-Pro Football Teams

References

Cultural appropriation
Native Americans in popular culture
Lists of sports teams
Sports mascots
Lists of names
Lists of mascots
Native American-related lists